The Algemene Wet Bijzondere Ziektekosten ("general law on exceptional medical expenses"), often known by the acronym AWBZ, is a Dutch health care law that first came into effect in 1968. It aims to provide general insurance covering the Dutch population against special health care needs. AWBZ is mainly aimed at financing 'care', as opposed to 'cure', which is mainly financed by insurers regulated by the Zorgverzekeringswet. It finances most of the healthcare expenditures.

It can cover:

 Nursing care such as medication and taking care of injuries.
 Personal Care such as help with the preparation of meals, dressing and undressing or showering. 
 Assistance with activities such as managing money or other practical matters.
 Assistance in dealing with problems  this includes guidance with problems of a psychological nature.
 Rehabilitation treatment
 Residential care

References

1968 in the Netherlands
1968 in law
Dutch legislation
Health law in the Netherlands